The Free State of Mecklenburg-Schwerin was a state in the Weimar Republic that was established on 14 November 1918 upon the abdication of the Grand Duke of Mecklenburg-Schwerin following the German Revolution. In 1933, after the onset of Nazi rule, it was united with the smaller neighbouring Free State of Mecklenburg-Strelitz to form the new united state of Mecklenburg on 1 January 1934.

Government
The state parliament consisted of a landtag of a varying number of members but not fewer than 50, elected for a term of three years by universal suffrage. The state administration, headed by a Minister-President was responsible to the landtag and could be removed by a vote of no confidence. For most of the Weimar period, the state governments were headed by either a Social Democrat or a Nationalist. However, in the June 1932 landtag election, the Nazi Party became the largest party with 49% of the vote and a Nazi, Walter Granzow, became Minister-President on 13 July. Thus, Mecklenburg-Schwerin was one of only five states to have installed a Nazi-led government before the Nazis came to power nationally.

Following their seizure of power at the national level, the Nazi government enacted the "Second Law on the Coordination of the States with the Reich" that established more direct control over the states by means of the new powerful position of Reichsstatthalter (Reich Governor). Friedrich Hildebrandt was installed in this post on 26 May 1933. By the end of the year, Hildebrandt, who was also Reichsstatthalter of the neighboring Free State of Mecklenburg-Strelitz, moved to consolidate his domains and merged the two states into a new united state of Mecklenburg, effective 1 January 1934. And with that, the brief fifteen-year existence of the Free State of Mecklenburg-Schwerin passed into history.

Rulers of Mecklenburg-Schwerin

President of the State Ministry
Hugo Wendorff (DDP) 1918–1919

Minister-Presidents
Hugo Wendorff (DDP) 1919–1920
Hermann Reincke-Bloch (DVP) 1920–1921
Johannes Stelling (SPD) 1921–1924
Joachim Freiherr von Brandenstein (DNVP) 1924–1926
Paul Schröder (SPD) 1926–1929
Karl Eschenburg (Consortium of National Mecklenburgers) 1929–1932
Walter Granzow (NSDAP) 1932–1933
Hans Egon Engell (NSDAP) 1933

Reichsstatthalter
Friedrich Hildebrandt (NSDAP) 1933

See also
Mecklenburg-Schwerin Landtag elections in the Weimar Republic

References

External links
States of Germany since 1918

1918 establishments in Germany
1933 disestablishments in Germany
Free State of Mecklenburg-Schwerin
States of the Weimar Republic